Memento Mori is the fifth studio album by the Norwegian heavy metal band Sahg, released on September 23, 2016 under Indie Recordings. The album features two new band members:  drummer Mads Lilletvedt (ex- Hellish Outcast) and guitarist Ole Walaunet (a.k.a. Lust Kilman from Gaahls Wyrd).

A music video was made for "Black Unicorn" (third single of the album),  directed by Benjamin Langeland from Flimmer Film AS.

Background 
The album release date coincides with the 39th birthday of Olav Iversen (Sahg frontman), an aspect that's symbolic to the title. Iversen explains:

Track listing

Personnel

Sahg 
Olav Iversen - Vocals, guitars
Tony Vetaas - Bass, vocals
Mads Lilletvedt - Drums
Ole Walaunet - Guitars

Guest/session musicians 
Einar Selvik - Vocals (backing), Percussion (Additional) (Track 8)
Iver Sandøy - Vocals (backing)
Torbjørn Schei - Vocals (backing)

Production and engineering 
Robert Høyem - Cover art, design
Iver Sandøy - Production
Recorded at Duper Studio & Solslottet Studio.
Mixed & mastered at Solslottet Studio.

References

External links 
Memento Mori at Metallum Archives
Discogs.com

2016 albums
Sahg albums
Indie Recordings albums